Mary Blanchard may refer to:

Mary Margaret Blanchard, character in Once Upon A Time
Mary Hazelton Blanchard Wade (née Mary Blanchard, 1860–1936), American writer